Independence High School is a public high school located in Independence, Ohio, south of Cleveland.  It is a part of the Independence Local School District. The school colors are blue and gold, and athletic teams are known as the Blue Devils.

Summary
Located in Cuyahoga County, Independence High School is accredited as a four-year, comprehensive high school by the Ohio State Department of Education. The school year consists of two ninety-day semesters with four nine-week grading periods.

Curriculum

College preparatory subjects are available within a broadly based program of studies. Special programs are available for gifted, learning-disabled, and at-risk students. Students may also participate in a number of vocational programs at Cuyahoga Valley Career Center. Also available are two computer labs and a library with computers all linked to a student server. Technology is routinely integrated into all academic disciplines through the use of document cameras, over-head projectors, smart boards, and Power Point presentations.

Facilities

A shared use facility was completed in 2004-2005 in conjunction with the City of Independence. The building includes a cafeteria built to accommodate up to 3,000 people, a 1,200-seat auditorium with an orchestra pit and fly system, a 1,200-seat,  gymnasium built to collegiate basketball standards, a 46-seat lecture hall, and a media center with a 75-person conference room.

State championships

 Boys track and field - 1948
 Boys cross country - 2009, 2010
 Girls golf - 2017

External links

Notes and references

High schools in Cuyahoga County, Ohio
Public high schools in Ohio